invoiceit is a range of business and accounting software, first written in 1998 by Bernard Reber of The Scrambled Card Company from Auckland, New Zealand. The software is sold on a try-before-you-buy basis.

History 
The Scrambled Card Company was founded in 1991 with the aim of marketing its own range of novel and humorous greeting cards (a fully assembled picture puzzle on which the sender would add their own comments, then scramble the card and mail the pieces in an envelope). This venture was only moderately successful and in 1993, using the original name, the company changed direction and began to develop custom database applications using MS Access (which had just been introduced). Invoiceit grew out of this work, incorporating their stable database elements that had been tested in the field. The company has been a member of Association of Software Professionals since 2003.

May 1998 – invoiceit is first published
November 2001 – re-launch with new branding and web presence (www.scrambled-card.com)
February 2003 – new website www.invoiceit.com established
May 2006 – Invoiceit!Lite was published
January 2008 – the highly successful invoiceit!4 was replaced with invoiceit!5 in (renamed invoiceit!Pro soon after)
July 2008 – invoiceit!TimePlus was introduced
August 2008 – free edition was published, initially called invoiceit!Free. It became 'My Invoice Kit' in August 2009 and has some data input limits.
May 2009 – publication of an accounting spreadsheet solution, called 'Simple Accounting', based on MS Excel.

Program versions 
invoiceit is published in four versions:

invoiceit!Pro 
This application can be LAN networked with 11 fully integrated modules.
Modules description:
Contacts — used for storing and manage customers, vendors and other contacts
Gross accounting software — The best GST accounting software provider in Rajkot.
Inventory (Stock) — for maintaining and monitoring inventory and its valuation based on FIFO.
Services — maintain stored service charges
Purchasing — used for writing and receiving purchase orders. Forms the basis for Accounts payable
Quotations (Estimates) — used for writing and maintaining quotes and estimates
Invoices — used for writing and maintaining invoices and credit memos. Forms basis for Accounts receivable
Auto-Billing — for setting up and maintain recurring billing contracts
Time Billing — for setting up jobs and record job-related activity on time sheets and subcontractors' charge sheets.
Scheduler — for setting up appointments and job-related activity
Accounting — cash-book (single entry) based, with accounts payable and accounts receivable.
Marketing — used for setting up of mailings and e-mails to customers.
The current release is version 5.1.19.1 from March 2011.

invoiceit!Time+ 
First introduced in July 2008 and intended for users who bill for their time. Can also be LAN networked. Similar to invoiceit!Pro but excludes stock/inventory control and accounting. The current release is version 1.2.01 from November 2010.

invoiceit!Lite 
Published in May 2006 and for users with simpler requirements. Includes customers, products, purchasing, quotes, invoicing and reports. The current release is 3.4.03.1 from July 2009.

My Invoice Kit 
Available since August 2008, previously known as invoiceit!Free but renamed a year later. Freeware with data input restrictions which limit the number of contacts to 25 and the monthly number of documents (combined quotes, invoices, purchase orders) to 10. The current release is 1.15 from July 2009.

Simple Accounting 
First published in May 2009. It is a very simple spreadsheet-based application that is used for entering an enterprise's income and expenses. It applies automatic summaries of payments to vendors and receipts from customers. Includes a spreadsheet for determining cash flow. This application does not have version numbers but is updated each year.

See also 
Comparison of accounting software

References 

Accounting software